Mərəlik (also, Maralıq, Maralik, Merelik, and Maralyk) is a village and municipality in the Shahbuz District of Nakhchivan, Azerbaijan. It is located in the near of the Yevlakh-Lachin-Nakhchivan highway, 8 km in the west from the district center. Its population is busy with farming and animal husbandry. There are Primary school, club, library and a medical center in the village. It has a population of 212.

Etymology
The name of the village consists from the Arabic word of məra (common pasture, pastures) and from the suffix -lıq in the meaning of the place, location in Azerbaijani language, means "the location of pasture, the place of pasture".

References 

Populated places in Shahbuz District